Chris Carter (born September 27, 1974) is a former American football safety in the National Football League (NFL). He played for the New England Patriots, the Cincinnati Bengals, and the Houston Texans.

1974 births
Living people
Sportspeople from Tyler, Texas
American football safeties
Texas Longhorns football players
New England Patriots players
Cincinnati Bengals players
Houston Texans players
Players of American football from Texas